San Francisco Suite is an album by American pianist Freddie Redd recorded in 1957 and released on the Riverside label.

Reception

The Allmusic review by Scott Yanow awarded the album 4½ stars and stated: "An excellent effort".

Track listing
All compositions by Freddie Redd, except as indicated
 "San Francisco Suite: View of the Golden Gate Bridge from Sausalito / Grant Street (Chinatown) / Barbary Coast / Cousin Jimbo's Between 3 & 7 A.M. / Dawn In The City" - 13:26 
 "Blue Hour" - 3:33 
 "By Myself" (Howard Dietz, Arthur Schwartz) - 3:43 
 "Ol' Man River" (Oscar Hammerstein II, Jerome Kern) - 4:01 
 "Minor Interlude" - 4:57 
 "This Is New" (Ira Gershwin, Kurt Weill) - 6:31 
 "Nica Steps Out" - 4:19
Recorded in New York City on October 2, 1957.

Personnel
Freddie Redd - piano  
George Tucker - bass
Al Dreares - drums

References

1957 albums
Freddie Redd albums
Riverside Records albums